Tegan Jade Martin (born 7 September 1992) is an Australian model, hairdresser and beauty pageant titleholder who was crowned Miss Universe Australia on 6 June 2014 and represented her country at the Miss Universe 2014 pageant.

Early life
Tegan Martin grew up in the suburbs of Charlestown and Jewells in the city of Newcastle NSW. Martin attended St Joseph's Primary School Charlestown and then St Mary's High School Gateshead until Year 10 when she left school to become a full-time hairdressing apprentice at Pandora's Hair Witchery. Martin has been living in Sydney for the last few years in order to further her modeling career. She is now studying a Bachelor of Health Science and is a qualified hair and make-up artist.

Career

Pageantry

Miss Universe Australia 2011
Martin finished as the 1st Runner-up at Miss Universe Australia 2011 represented Newcastle. Meanwhile, the official winner was Scherri-Lee Biggs from Watermans Bay, Perth crowned as 2011 winner and competed at Miss Universe 2011 in São Paulo, Brazil. She placed in Top 10.

Miss Universe Australia 2013
Martin finished as the 1st Runner-up at Miss Universe Australia 2013 represented Newcastle. Meanwhile, the official winner was Olivia Wells from Melbourne, Victoria crowned as the 2013 winner and competed at Miss Universe 2013 in Moscow, Russia where she did not place in the top 16.

Miss Universe Australia 2014
Martin was crowned as Miss Universe Australia 2014 represented Newcastle on her third attempt.

Miss Universe 2014
Martin represented Australia at Miss Universe 2014 where she placed among the Top 10. Her roommate was Miss USA, Nia Sanchez who placed first runner-up.

Television

Celebrity Apprentice

In 2015, Martin appeared as a celebrity contestant on the fourth season of Nine Network's Australian reality series The Celebrity Apprentice Australia. Martin was fired in the 7th task, but raised $130,782 for her charity The Sydney Children's Hospital Westmead (Metabolic Clinic).

I'm a Celebrity

In January 2017, Martin was revealed as a celebrity contestant on the third season of Network Ten's Australian reality series I'm a Celebrity...Get Me Out of Here!. On 5 March 2017, Martin was the 6th celebrity eliminated from the series after 38 days in the jungle coming in 9th place.

References

External links

Miss Universe Australia Official website

1992 births
People from Newcastle, New South Wales
Australian female models
Models from Sydney
Australian beauty pageant winners
Miss Universe Australia winners
Miss Universe 2014 contestants
The Apprentice Australia candidates
I'm a Celebrity...Get Me Out of Here! (Australian TV series) participants
Living people